Shadravan District is a district (bakhsh) in Shushtar County, Khuzestan Province, Iran. At the 2006 census, its population was 20,568, in 3,657 families.  The district has one city Guriyeh.  The district has two rural districts (dehestan): Shoaybiyeh-ye Gharbi Rural District and Shoaybiyeh-ye Sharqi Rural District.

References 

Shushtar County
Districts of Khuzestan Province